Wells Fargo Arena (formerly Ameris Arena) is a 3,000-seat indoor arena located in Dothan, Alabama. It is part of the National Peanut Festival complex, and is used for sporting events including rodeos. It is also used for concerts.

Wells Fargo Arena is unique in that its sides have no walls; the arena's stands are built of aluminum. The arena takes up  of space and contains a dirt floor.

External links
National Peanut Festival facilities including Wells Fargo Arena
Indoor arenas in Alabama
Sports venues in Alabama
Buildings and structures in Dothan, Alabama
Rodeo venues in the United States
Sports in Dothan, Alabama